Usability engineering is a field that is concerned generally with human–computer interaction and specifically with devising human–computer interfaces that have high usability or user friendliness. It provides structured methods for achieving efficiency and elegance in interface design.

Several broad disciplines including Psychology, Human Factors and Cognitive Science subsume usability engineering, but the theoretical foundations of the field come from more specific domains: human perception and action; human cognition; behavioral research methodologies; and, to a lesser extent, quantitative and statistical analysis techniques.

When usability engineering began to emerge as a distinct area of professional practice in the mid to late 1980s, many usability engineers had a background in Computer Science or in a sub-field of Psychology such as Perception, Cognition or Human Factors. Today, these academic areas still serve as springboards for the professional practitioner of usability engineering, but Cognitive Science departments and academic programs in Human-Computer Interaction now also produce their share of practitioners in the field.

Standards and guidelines 

Usability engineers sometimes work to shape an interface such that it adheres to accepted operational definitions of user requirements documentation. For example, the International Organization for Standardization approved definitions (see e.g., ISO 9241 part 11) usability are held by some to be a context, efficiency, and satisfaction with which specific users should be able to perform tasks. Advocates of this approach engage in task analysis, then prototype interface design, and usability testing on those designs. On the basis of such tests, the technology is potentially redesigned if necessary.

The National Institute of Standards and Technology has collaborated with industry to develop the Common Industry Specification for Usability – Requirements, which serves as a guide for many industry professionals. The specifications for successful usability in biometrics were also developed by the NIST. Usability.gov, a no-longer maintained website formerly operated by the US General Services Administration, provided a tutorial and wide general reference for the design of usable websites.

Usability, especially with the goal of Universal Usability, encompasses the standards and guidelines of design for accessibility. The aim of these guidelines is to facilitate the use of a software application for people with disabilities. Some guidelines for web accessibility are:

The Web Accessibility Initiative Guidelines.
The Section 508 government guidelines applicable to all public-sector websites.
The ADA Guidelines for accessibility of state and local government websites.
The IBM Guidelines for accessibility of websites.

Errors in usability engineering 
In usability engineering, it's important target and identify human errors when interacting with the product of interest because if a user is expected to engage with a product, interface, or service in some way, the very introduction of a human in that engagement increases the potential of encountering human error. Error should be reduced as much as possible in order to avoid frustration or injury. There are two main types of human errors which are categorized as slips and mistakes. Slips are a very common kind of error involving automatic behaviors (i.e. typos, hitting the wrong menu item). When we experience slips, we have the correct goal in mind, but execute the wrong action.
Mistakes on the other hand involve conscious deliberation that result in the incorrect conclusion. When we experience mistakes, we have the wrong goal in mind and thereby execute the wrong action.

Even though slips are the more common type of error, they are no less dangerous. A certain type of slip error, a mode error, can be especially dangerous if a user is executing a high-risk task. For instance, if a user is operating a vehicle and does not realize they are in the wrong mode (i.e. reverse), they might step on the gas intending to drive, but instead accelerate into a garage wall or another car. In order to avoid modal errors, designers often employ modeless states in which users do not have to choose a mode at all, or they must execute a continuous action while intending to execute a certain mode (i.e. pressing a key continuously in order to activate "lasso" mode in Photoshop).

Methods and tools 
Usability engineers conduct usability evaluations of existing or proposed interfaces and their findings are fed back to the designer for use in design or redesign. Common usability evaluation methods include:
Usability testing
Interviews
Focus groups
Questionnaires/surveys
Cognitive walkthroughs
Heuristic evaluations
RITE method
Cognitive task analysis
Contextual inquiry
Think aloud protocol
Card sorting

Usability testing is when participants are recruited and asked to use the actual or prototype interface and their reactions, behaviors, errors, and self-reports in interviews are carefully observed and recorded by a usability engineer. On the basis of this data, the usability engineer recommends interface changes to improve usability. These studies can be either analytical or empirical.

There are a variety of online resources that make the job of a usability engineer a little easier. Some examples of these include:

The Web Metrics Tool Suite

This is a product of the National Institute of Standards and Technology. This toolkit is focused on evaluating the HTML of a website versus a wide range of usability guidelines and includes:
 Web Static Analyzer Tool (WebSAT) – checks web page HTML against typical usability guidelines
 Web Category Analysis Tool (WebCAT) – lets the usability engineer construct and conduct a web category analysis
 Web Variable Instrumenter Program (WebVIP) – instruments a website to capture a log of user interaction
 Framework for Logging Usability Data (FLUD) – a file format and parser for representation of user interaction logs
 FLUDViz Tool – produces a 2D visualization of a single user session
 VisVIP Tool – produces a 3D visualization of user navigation paths through a website
 TreeDec – adds navigation aids to the pages of a website

The Usability Testing Environment (UTE)

This tool is produced by Mind Design Systems is available freely to federal government employees. According to the official company website this tool consists of two tightly-integrated applications. The first is the UTE Manager, which helps a tester set up test scenarios (tasks) as well as survey and demographic questions. The UTE Manager also compiles the test results and produces customized reports and summary data, which can be used as quantitative measures of usability observations and recommendations.

The second UTE application is the UTE Runner. The UTE Runner presents the test participants with the test scenarios (tasks) as well as any demographic and survey questions. In addition, the UTE Runner tracks the actions of the subject throughout the test including clicks, keystrokes, and scrolling.

The UsableNet Liftmachine

This tool is a product of UsableNet.com and implements the section 508 Usability and Accessibility guidelines as well as the W3C Web Accessibility Initiative Guidelines.

It is important to remember that online tools are only a useful tool, and do not substitute for a complete usability engineering analysis.

Research resources 

Some well-known practitioners in the field are Donald Norman, Jakob Nielsen, Deborah Mayhew and John M. Carroll. Nielsen and Carroll have both written books on the subject of usability engineering. Nielsen's book is aptly titled Usability Engineering, and was published in 1993. Carroll wrote Making Use: Scenario-Based Design of Human-Computer Interactions in 2000, and co-authored "Usability Engineering: Scenario-Based Development of Human-Computer Interaction" with Mary Beth Rossen in 2001. Some other field leaders are Alan Cooper, Larry Constantine and Steve Krug the author of "Don't Make Me Think! A Common Sense Approach to Web Usability".

There are many books written on Usability Engineering. A few of the more popular recently published books are as follows:

See also
 User interface engineering
 Usability
 User experience design
 Usability testing
 World Usability Day
 Component-Based Usability Testing
 Agile usability engineering

Bibliography

References

External links
Usability.gov
The National Institute of Standards and Technology
The Web Accessibility Initiative Guidelines

Usability